The septum pellucidum (Latin for "translucent wall") is a thin, triangular, vertical double membrane separating the anterior horns of the left and right lateral ventricles of the brain. It runs as a sheet from the corpus callosum down to the fornix.

The septum is not present in the syndrome septo-optic dysplasia.

Structure
The septum pellucidum is located in the septal area in the midline of the brain between the two cerebral hemispheres. The septal area is also the location of the septal nuclei. It is attached to the lower part of the corpus callosum, the large collection of nerve fibers that connect the two cerebral hemispheres. It is attached to the front forward part of the fornix. The lateral ventricles sit on either side of the septum.

The septum pellucidum consists of two layers or laminae of both white and gray matter. During fetal development, there is a space between the two laminae called the cave of septum pellucidum that, in ninety percent of cases, disappears during infancy. 
The cavum was occasionally referred to as the fifth ventricle, but this is no longer used because the space is usually not continuous with the ventricular system. The fifth ventricle is recognised as the terminal enlargement of the spinal cord.

Clinical significance
Absence of the septum pellucidum occurs in septo-optic dysplasia, a rare developmental disorder usually characterized by abnormal development of the optic disk and pituitary deficiencies. Symptoms of septo-optic dysplasia are highly variable and may include vision difficulties, low muscle tone, hormonal problems, seizures, intellectual problems, and jaundice at birth. Management is directed at the symptoms a person is affected with.

Additional images

See also

References

External links

Cerebrum
Ventricular system